Wilkes University is a private university in Wilkes-Barre, Pennsylvania. It has over 2,200 undergraduates and over 2,200 graduate students (both full and part-time). Wilkes was founded in 1933 as a satellite campus of Bucknell University, and became an independent institution in 1947, naming itself Wilkes College, after English radical politician John Wilkes after whom Wilkes-Barre is named. The school was granted university status in January 1990. It is classified among "Doctoral/Professional Universities".  Wilkes University is accredited by the Commission on Higher Education of the Middle States Association of Colleges and Secondary Schools.

The school mascot is a Colonel and the official colors are blue and yellow.  The campus symbol is a letter "W" known as the "flying W" by students and alumni.

History

Origins of the college

Mid Twentieth Century
Wilkes University was first established in 1933 by Bucknell University under the name Bucknell University Junior College (BUJC) in Wilkes-Barre. Frank G. Davis, chair of the Education department at Bucknell, first developed the idea of BUJC and served as an early liaison between BUJC and Bucknell. BUJC attracted many students who were the first members of their families to benefit from higher education as the need for junior colleges arose in urban areas. The college opened in downtown Wilkes-Barre, where the first classes were held on the third floor of the Wilkes-Barre Business College building.  By 1934, the business college moved out of the building and BUJC had taken it over and continued to grow over the years, acquiring old mansions for student housing, classrooms, and administration offices along the streets of South River and South Franklin. By 1945, the Board of Trustees formally moved to develop the junior college into a four-year institution.

In 1947, Wilkes College was instituted as an independent, nondenominational four-year college, with programs in the arts, sciences, and a number of professional fields, as well as numerous extracurricular activities. The student body in the postwar period was primarily composed of Luzerne County residents, especially G.I. bill recipients. In the 1950s, increasing numbers of students elected to live on campus, which led to a rapid expansion in on-campus student housing.  Increased federal funding for science and engineering in the 1950s led the college to develop academic programs in those areas, build the Stark Learning Center, and increase enrollment.

Late Twentieth Century
Wilkes College became Wilkes University in December 1989, and the school officially received university status a month later, in January 1990.

Wilkes University opened the School of Pharmacy in 1996, and in 1999, through a donation from Mrs. Geraldine Nesbitt Orr, the Nesbitt School of Pharmacy was established.

The Thomas P. (Pettus) Shelburne Jr. Telecommunications Center was built under the guidance of chief engineer Carl Brigido and dedicated by Wilkes University in the lower level of the Start Learning Center in 1996. Secured after a major gift from Shelburne's widow Catherine and family and fundraising efforts of long time Communication Studies professors, Dr. Bradford L. Kinney and Thomas Bigler.  This was the second television studio on campus, previously located in two small rooms on the second floor of the Stark Learning Center.  The Shelburne Center became the first dedicated space built with first use equipment for the direct purpose of media education with multiple editing bays, two studio spaces, educational break out teaching space and director offices and storage.  The Shelburne Center served for twenty years as the pre-curser to the Clayton and Theresa Karambelas Media and Communications Center dedicated in 2017 that consolidated all of the University media holdings for instruction.

2000s /Early Twenty-first Century
The Jay S. Sidhu School of Business & Leadership was created in 2004, and the university purchased a  building in downtown Wilkes-Barre. to house the expanding school.  Initially named the Center on Main the building houses the Sidhu School of Business and Leadership, an indoor track and field, and ropes course. August 11, 2021, the Center on Main was formally named after Ron and Rhea Simms to be known as Simms Center on Main.[47]

The Henry Student Center was expanded in 2005.

By 2014, Wilkes University grew to include eight academic buildings, 20 residence halls, nine administrative buildings, and other facilities such as the Eugene S. Farley Library, the Henry Student Center, and athletic complexes.

On April 17, 2015 Wilkes University dedicated the main university mailroom facility located on the second floor of the Henry Student Center as the Edward Elgonitis Sr. Mailroom or simply "Eddie's Mailroom" in honor of the thirty-three year dedicated Wilkes University staff member.

August 31, 2017 the University dedicated the Clayton and Theresa Karambelas Media and Communication Center, built within the structure of the original Bartikowsky Jewelers building on 25 West South Street by the Sordoni Contractors to be the first constructed to hold all the university media instruction holdings into one consolidated building.  The building also houses the Sordoni Art Gallery that moved from its original location on the first level of the Stark Learning Center.

March 2020 Wilkes University temporarily suspended in-person instruction and evacuated the campus as a safety measure to address the global COVID-19 pandemic.  Under the leadership of alumnus, Interim President Dr. Paul S. Adams '77 the university continued basic operations and was able to safely re-open following strict protocols.  Commencement for the Class of 2020 was postponed and eventually held in-person along with the Class of 2021.

Presidents of Wilkes University
Eugene S. Farley, 1936–1970           →Chief Administrative Officer of Wilkes precursor Bucknell University Junior College and Wilkes University first president. Wilkes' first holder of Chancellor/Honorary President title upon retirement. 
Francis J. Michelini, 1970–1975       →First president to ascend from the academic ranks, after serving as Wilkes biology faculty and then academic dean.  Resigned to become President of Pennsylvania Commission on Independent Colleges and Universities.
Robert S. Capin '50* H'83; 1975–1984  →*First university alumnus to serve in presidential capacity.  Wilkes first holder of President Emeritus title upon retirement as president and returning to the business faculty.
Christopher N. Breiseth, 1984-2001  →First president hired as part of a national recruitment search.  Retired to accept position as founding President and CEO of Franklin and Eleanor Roosevelt Institute.
Joseph "Tim" E. Gilmour, 2001-2012  →Currently serves on team of Strategic Initiatives.
Patrick F. Leahy, 2012–2019 →Resigned effective July 31, 2019 to accept Presidency of Monmouth University in Monmouth, New Jersey.
Alan Gregory "Greg" Cant, 2020–present →First international president having hailed from Australia.

Interim presidents of Wilkes University
Robert S. Capin '50* H'83; 1974    →*First university alumnus to serve in presidential capacity.  Promoted to President 1975.  Wilkes first holder of President Emeritus title upon retirement as president and return to the business faculty.
Paul S. Adams '77, '82*; 2019-2020      →*Second university alumnus to serve in presidential capacity and first to ascend from the student affairs division.  Retired 2022 concluding forty-year career at University.

Campus

Academic buildings
Most of the academic buildings are located within the same city block, between South River Street, South Franklin Street, South Street, and Northampton Street. The Stark Learning Center (SLC), located on South River Street, is the largest building on campus with  housing classrooms, laboratories, and office space. The facility consists of nursing, math and engineering offices and classrooms.  Stark Learning Center received extensive renovation in 2018.

Classrooms and offices for humanities and social sciences are located in Breiseth Hall, a three-story building located on South Franklin Street, in the same block as SLC. Kirby Hall, a mansion formerly home to Fred Morgan Kirby, was renovated to house offices and classrooms for English.

The Cohen Science Center, a $35 million project, was established to house the biology and health sciences, chemistry and biochemistry, and environmental engineering and earth sciences departments. The facility has been built to LEED silver standards for environmental sustainability and allows for students to monitor energy use, water use, and general building performance to aid sustainability studies. The building also features a rooftop vegetation area for greenhouse purposes and to assist in reducing rain runoff.

Simms Center on Main [formerly University Center on Main]
In 2005, the university acquired the former Wilkes-Barre Call Center building and parking garage on South Main Street. The parking garage is currently being used for student and faculty parking. The Public Safety department has remodeled and relocated to the basement of the garage. The Call Center building was renovated and renamed University Center on Main. The building now houses recreation facilities including tennis and basketball courts, and a rock climbing wall. In summer 2014, the building was renovated to also house the Sidhu School of Business and Leadership.  On August 11, 2021, the center was formally named after Ron and Rhea Simms to be known as Simms Center on Main.

Residential Halls
The campus offers seventeen different residence halls and apartment buildings for all levels of students, although some apartments are reserved for upperclassmen. Many residence halls are located in 19th century mansions that were donated to the university, or other houses purchased by the university. Over 11 mansion and house style residence halls are used throughout the campus. Apartment style residences are found in University Towers and Rifkin Hall. Non-apartment residence halls include Catlin Hall, Doane Hall, Evans Hall, Fortinsky Halls, Michelini Hall, Passan Hall, Ross Hall, Roth Hall, Schiowitz Hall, Sterling Hall, Sturdevant Hall, Sullivan Hall, University Towers, Waller Halls (North and South), and Weiss Hall. Dr. Francis J. Michelini Hall houses students registered for the university Honors Program.  First year and second year students are required to live in residence halls (commuters are exempt), and can live off-campus starting their third year.

Traditional dormitory housing is provided at Evans Residence Hall. With four floors and about 200 students, Evans Residence Hall is the largest first-year student residential hall on the Wilkes University campus. Renovated in 2008, Chesapeake and Delaware Residence Halls were re-dedicated as Lawrence W. Roth Residence Hall, a residential hall connecting the previously separate Chesapeake and Delaware Residence Halls. It is a first year student, non-traditional residential hall house with about seventy residents and three RAs. Students living on campus have access to laundry facilities, basic cable, and local phone service.

The university purchased the University Towers apartment complex located at 10 East South Street from a private real estate company for $8.1 million. Approximately 400 students are housed in this building's 130 units. Part of the nearby YMCA building has been renovated into apartment style residences and houses upperclassman. The apartments are known as 40 West.

Colonel Corner University Bookstore
The university partnered with neighboring King's College to operate a joint for-profit bookstore in downtown Wilkes-Barre. The new bookstore opened in October 2006, consolidating two independent bookstores into one new facility. The new bookstore, run by Barnes & Noble College Booksellers, was located in the basement and first floor of the Innovation Center on South Main Street. The bookstore included a full selection of general trade books, a full-service Starbucks cafe, lounges and study areas, and a spirit shop featuring products from both Wilkes and King's College.  In 2021 the bookstore returned to the main campus no longer partnered with King's College. Colonel Corner is located inside the Henry Student Center and offers school supplies and spirit wear.

Karambelas Media and Communications Center 
In August 2017, the university dedicated the newly renovated Bartikowsky Jewelers building as the Clayton and Theresa Karambelas Media and Communications Center. It houses WCLH 90.7 FM (the university radio station), the Beacon newspaper, Zebra Communications (a student-run public relations agency) and the Sordoni Art Gallery.

Dorothy Dickson Darte Center for the Performing Arts 
The Darte Center is the home of performing arts at Wilkes University. Built in 1965 to replace the Chase Theater (a converted carriage house), it includes the Darling Theater, which seats 478, a black box theater which seats 48, and a two-story music building. The land on which the Darte Center sits was donated by the Wyoming Valley Society of Arts and Sciences. The building was financed by an anonymous donation of $1 million by Dorothy Dickson Darte and dedicated in her honor after her death.

Eugene Shedden Farley Library 
In 1968, Wilkes College dedicated the newly constructed Eugene Shedden Farley Library and named it after the college's first president. The library initially contained four special collection rooms - dedicated to Admiral Harold Stark, Eleanor C. Farley, Gilbert McClintock, and Wyoming Valley residents of Polish heritage. The Polish room was designed by Stefan Mrozewski in the Zakopane Style, and Stefan Hellersperk carved the furniture.  The first Norman Mailer Room was dedicated in 2000, and the second Norman Mailer Room and Collection were dedicated in October 2019. The Harold Cox Archives room, which houses the Wilkes University Archives, was dedicated in 2004 and 2013. As of 2019, the library contained 200,000 books and bound journals, 75,000 electronic journals, and 430 newspaper and journal subscriptions, as well as circulating technology like iPads and laptops.

Academics
Wilkes University has a 14 to one student to faculty ratio and with over 50 percent of classes having fewer than 20 students per class. The university is accredited by the Middle State Association of Colleges and Schools and has also received accreditation from various professional accreditation associations for individual degree plans. The university offers majors in science, education, engineering, business, and liberal arts for undergraduate and graduate students. The academic programs at Wilkes University are divided among three colleges:
College of Arts and Sciences
College of Business and Engineering
College of Health and Education

The College of Arts and Sciences includes programs in the performing arts, humanities, behavioral and social sciences, environmental sciences and natural sciences. The College of Business and Engineering programs in Electrical Engineering, Environmental Engineering, and Mechanical Engineering are accredited by the Engineering Accreditation Commission (EAC) of the Accreditation Board of Engineering and Technology (ABET).  The school's Nesbitt School of Pharmacy is one of seven pharmacy schools in Pennsylvania. The school is fully accredited by the Accreditation Council for Pharmacy Education. The Passan School of Nursing undergraduate baccalaureate program in Nursing is approved by the Pennsylvania State Board of Nurse Examiners and is accredited by the Commission on Collegiate Nursing Education. The Jay S. Sidhu School of Business and Leadership within the College of Business and Engineering has several business degree plans and includes one of the most popular undergraduate majors, management.  Select undergraduate programs of the Sidhu School are accredited by the Accreditation Council for Business Schools and Programs.

Graduate studies
Wilkes University offers over a dozen programs within its graduate school programs. The Wilkes Graduate Teacher Education Program hosts classes online and at classroom sites across Pennsylvania. Some of the Wilkes Graduate Teacher Education programs are hosted entirely online. Other graduate programs such as nursing, creative writing, and bioengineering are also offered at the university. The MBA program within the Jay S. Sidhu School of Business and Leadership was ranked among the top ten MBA programs in the state of Pennsylvania.

Rankings
According to U.S. News & World Report’s recent rankings, Wilkes ranks #234 in the National University Overall category. #82 in Top Performers on Social Mobility, #205 in Best Undergraduate Engineering Programs, #413 in Nursing,The Princeton Review, in their recent ranking, ranked Wilkes for the "Best Northeastern" rankings.

Campus life

Student life

Traditions
Wilkes University students take part in a number of traditions on campus most around new student orientation and during the seven days leading to Spring commencement (a.k.a. Senior Week). Including:
 Homecoming Dinner/Dance (typically at Genetti's or The Woodlands).
 Homecoming Week Banner design competition and Residence Hall outdoor decorating.
 ROTC, Nursing and Pharmacy pinning ceremonies upon commencement.
 Senior Salute 
 Community Service project during Orientation Week and Senior Week.
 President's parent/ family reception during Senior Week (typically at Weckesser Hall).  
 President's Commencement Dinner/Dance (typically at Genetti's or The Woodlands).
 Promenade of graduates through campus led by bagpipers to the commencement site.  This includes touching the foot of the John Wilkes statue in the center of campus and proceeding through the Wilkes arches, through the gateway Fenner quadrangle and along South Franklin Street.
 Graduates may receive diploma from parent(s) [upon permission] if the parent(s) are employed by the university at the time of commencement.
 Senior Class President last in line of the graduating class to walk across stage to receive diploma.
 Sports Alumni Hall of Fame induction annual ceremony at the Marts Center.

Annual Commencement Awards

Mabel Scott Wandell Award and Sterling Leroy Wandell Award
The Mabel Scott Wandell and the Sterling Leroy Wandell awards are presented to the woman and man in Wilkes University's graduating class with the highest grade-point averages.
Teresa Jordan and Frank Mehm Prize 
The Mehm Prize is awarded annually to the undergraduate who most nearly represents the ideal respecting moral courage, unselfishness and noteworthy extracurricular participation significantly advancing the university on and off campus.
Alumni Leadership Award 
The Alumni Leadership Award is given by the Wilkes University Alumni Association to the member of the graduating class considered to have made the strongest contribution to student life and the student activities program of the university.

Student Life
Wilkes University has numerous student-run clubs and organizations that are recognized and funded by the student government. Many of the clubs are athletically focused, representing sports including crew, lacrosse, running, skiing, volleyball, and ultimate Frisbee. Clubs associated with academics and majors represent psychology, sociology, criminology, and pre-pharmacy. Other clubs are formed around common interests such as animal advocacy, vegetarianism, anime, and robotics.

Wilkes has an active student media, including a television station within the Karambelas Media and Communications Center, FM radio station WCLH (call letters stand for Wilkes College Listens Here) which celebrated its 50th anniversary in 2022, weekly newspaper The Beacon, a literary magazine Manuscript which celebrated its 75th anniversary in 2022, and yearbook Amnicola which will celebrate its 75th anniversary in 2023. The university's newspaper was originally published as the Bison Stampede in 1934. The publication was later renamed The Beacon, and the paper will celebrate its 90th anniversary in 2024.

Wilkes University Programming Board, an entertainment and event planning organization, has hosted events that featured Pennsylvania based bands such as Live and Fuel, and national favorites including Alanis Morissette, Rusted Root, Joan Osborne, Dashboard Confessional, Lifehouse, Busta Rhymes, Hoobastank, Jack's Mannequin, and Billy Joel.

Wilkes University launched the first collegiate marching band in the northeast Pennsylvania region in 2014. The university said that the new marching band will be a welcomed new tradition and it will contribute to a growth in school spirit.

Henry Student Center
The Frank M. and Dorothea Henry Student Center (HSC) is the student center on campus. The HSC was originally built in 1999, and has continued to serve the students through the present day. The Henry Student Center seeks to provide on-campus activities for all the students of Wilkes as well as maintain partnerships within the community that accentuate the student and community experience. A game room is also located in the student center, complete with multiple pool tables, TVs with wiis connected, ping pong, and other games.

The building is home to most of the student organizations on campus, as well as the dining facilities that are run by Sodexo Incorporated and a campus bookstore run by Barnes and Noble. All recognized student organizations can reserve space, or at least a meeting area to conduct business. The student-run journalism yearbook Amnicola and newspaper The Beacon, have both business office and production space in the first floor.  The second floor holds the university Edward Elgonitis Sr. Mailroom or simply "Eddie's Mailroom", shipping services and student mailboxes.

Within the building second floor corridor are framed portraits of every study body president to have served as the head Student Government leader since the inception of the school.

Large meeting space that can be reserved by the Wilkes communite are the Savitz Multicultural Room that includes a student painted multicultural mural that was led by long time art faculty member Sharon Cosgrove, Miller Meeting Room and the Paul S. '77 and Jean Ritter '78 '82 Adams Ballroom.

The building was named after Frank M., who served as an executive officer of the local family owned bus transportation company Martz Group, a service that continues to be used by countless generations of Wilkes students to return to and from campus for visits home using the many bus routes along the northeastern corridor and its connection services. His wife, Dorothea, was an active volunteer in the surrounding community.

Renovations for the new Henry Student Center began shortly after its initial opening to expand space in 2005 for student meetings on the 2nd floor, and continued with moderate renovations most recently with the Adams ballroom in 2023.

Student Government
The Student Government organization at Wilkes hosts many annual events for undergraduates such as Homecoming and Winter Weekend, an annual themed weekend event in which teams of students participate in various competitive challenges such as team skits and eating contests. The Wilkes Student Government also coordinates all the other university organizations and clubs by formulating student activity budgets and reviewing fund requests. The organization is composed of various executive positions and councils including the president, presidents of Commuter Council, Inter-residence Hall Council, representatives, and a president from each class.

Dining
There is currently one Sodexo operated full scale buffet style dining facility on the Wilkes campus located within the Henry Student Center on the second floor. A location designated as the Rifkin Cafe includes a convenience store and sandwich shop (where convenience store-like food and beverages are sold) is located on the first floor of the Henry Student Center. There are also small shops operated by Sodexo throughout the campus such as the Colonel Gambini Cafe Starbucks Coffee Shop named in honor of long-time food services staff member Glenn Gambini.

ROTC Program
Detachment 752 of the Air Force Reserve Officer Training Corps is located at Wilkes University. Established in 1973, AF ROTC Detachment 752 has trained and prepared hundreds of young men and women for future careers as USAF officers. Wilkes also offers Army ROTC, but the classes are held at nearby King's College. When students graduate from Wilkes and complete the ROTC program, they earn a commission as an officer in their respective military branches. The detachment serves 12 other crosstown colleges and universities in Northeast Pennsylvania.

Athletics
The Wilkes University Colonels compete in NCAA Division III athletics. The university is a member of the Middle Atlantic Conference (MAC). Wilkes offers numerous intercollegiate sports team organizations at the university. Wilkes men's intercollegiate sports teams include baseball, basketball, cross country, football, golf, lacrosse, soccer, swimming, tennis and wrestling. Wilkes women's intercollegiate sports teams include basketball, cross country, field hockey, golf, lacrosse, soccer, softball, swimming, tennis, and volleyball.

Men's conference titles
In 2007, the Wilkes University baseball team was the MAC Freedom Conference champion. Prior to that, the baseball team had been conference champion in 1994 and 1977.

In the 2007-2008 men's basketball season, the Wilkes men's team went 13-12 overall and finished fourth in the conference. Previously, the men's basketball team was Freedom Conference champion for the 2000–2001 season, 1998–99 season, 1997–98 season, and 1995–96 season.

The Wilkes University football team was the MAC champion for the 2006 season, and previously, the football team had been conference champion in 1993 and 1974. In the mid-1960s the Wilkes College football program had 32 straight wins—the fourth longest streak in college football history at the time. It began in the fourth game of the 1965 season and ended in 1969. From a 34–0 victory over Ursinus to a 13–7 loss to Ithaca. Rollie Schmidt coached the Colonels from 1962 to 1981. His teams went 90-73-1 winning five MAC titles, two Lambert Bowls (best small college team in the East) and one Timmie Award (best small college team in the country).

The men's tennis team was MAC Freedom Conference champion in 2008, 2009, 2010, 2011, 2012, 2013, 2014, 2015, and 2016.

The Wilkes wrestling team has won a total of 14 Middle Atlantic Conference team championships. In 1974, the team won the NCAA Div. III national championship, afterward, the Colonels moved to the NCAA Div. I ranks for 25 seasons before returning to Div. III ranks in 2000.

Women's conference titles
The Wilkes University women's field hockey team was MAC champions in 2013 and 1999. In 2008 the women's field hockey team was ranked 18th in the nation by the NCAA.

In 2005, the Wilkes women's soccer team was the MAC Freedom Conference champion. The following year, the Wilkes women's softball team won the MAC region in 2006. Prior to that, the women's softball team was the MAC champion in 1982.

The women's tennis team at Wilkes was the MAC Freedom Conference champion in 2006, 2008, 2009, 2010, 2011, 2012, 2013, and 2014. The women's volleyball team was the conference champion in 2006, 2008, 2009, 2010, and 2011.

Women's golf and women's swimming, both NCAA Division III intercollegiate sports, were introduced to Wilkes University's sports roster in the 2014–2015 season in the Middle Atlantic Conference.

Men's sports
Baseball
Basketball
Cross country
Football
Golf
Soccer
Swimming 
Tennis
Volleyball
Wrestling

Women's sports
Basketball
Cross country
Field hockey
Golf
Ice hockey
Lacrosse
Soccer
Softball
Swimming 
Tennis
Volleyball

Club sports
Baseball
Basketball (men and women)
Bowling
Crew
Cheerleading
Dance Team
Ice hockey
Lacrosse (men and women)
Rugby (men and women)
Soccer (men and women)
Softball
Swimming
Tennis
Ultimate frisbee (men and women)
Unified sports (Special Olympics)
Volleyball (men and women)

Annual and Major Campus Events

Lecture series
The university sponsors and hosts academically focused lectures series for its students and community. The Max Rosenn Lecture Series in Law and Humanities was established in the 1980s, and has brought many speakers to the university including author Norman Mailer, Supreme Court Justice John Paul Stevens, and journalist Bob Woodward.  The Allan P. Kirby Lecture in Free Enterprise and Entrepreneurship has also hosted speakers including journalist and television host John Stossel, and former New York Governor George Pataki. The center hosts two lectures annually. The United Nations lecture series was launched in the 2011–2012 academic year and the program brings U.N. officials to the campus to speak to students throughout the year through a partnership with the Higher Education Alliance of the United Nations.

Annual High School Mathematics Contest
For over 60 years Wilkes University has been the host of the Annual High School Mathematics Contest as sponsored by the Luzerne County Council of Teachers of Mathematics (LCCTM). Every year juniors and seniors from Luzerne County high schools come to Wilkes University to participate in the competition. The first-place winner in both the junior and senior divisions are awarded a full-tuition scholarship to Wilkes University.

ACM Intercollegiate Programming Contest
The Wilkes University Math and Computer Science Department hosts the Eastern Pennsylvania division of the Mid-Atlantic Region of the annual ACM International Collegiate Programming Contest. Wilkes University has been host to the event for the last 5 years. A total of 8 schools host teams in the Mid-Atlantic Region. The competition is sponsored by IBM and the contest challenges the participants knowledge and creativity in solving computer programming problems.

Annual Tom Bigler High School Journalism Conference
Annually, hundreds of Pennsylvania high school students attend this annual media oriented event. Each year features a notable keynote speaker, hands-on workshops in the areas of telecommunications, journalism and public relations and panel discussions and presentation from media professionals and personalities. A high school journalism contest and awards ceremony is also a main event.

Plays
The Wilkes University Theatre presents a full season of dramas and musicals on the main stage as well as a season of student produced black box productions at the Darte Center. The Division of Performing Arts presents a total of four shows annually at the Darte Center.

Notable alumni
Ann Bartuska, ecologist and biologist
Jackson Berkey, classical music composer, pianist, and singer
Marty Blake, general manager of the Atlanta Hawks franchise 
Gabriel J. Campana, former mayor of Williamsport, Pennsylvania
Catherine Chandler, poet
Jesse Choper, constitutional law scholar and former dean of the UC Berkeley School of Law
Catherine D. DeAngelis, first woman and the first pediatrician to become the editor of the Journal of the American Medical Association 
William R. Evanina, the NCIX, the National Counterintelligence Executive of the United States, and director of the U.S. National Counterintelligence and Security Center
Kevin Gryboski, Former Major League Baseball player, current Wilkes University head baseball coach 
Donora Hillard, author
Lawrence Hilton-Jacobs, actor Welcome Back Kotter
Marlon James, Jamaican novelist and winner of the 2015 Man Booker Prize
Amanda Kaster, current Director of the Montana Department of Natural Resources and Conservation (2021–present)
Evana Manandhar, Miss Nepal 2015 
Eddie Day Pashinski, Pennsylvania House of Representatives member 
 Steve Poleskie, artist and writer, Professor Emeritus at Cornell University
Bo Ryan, head coach of the University of Wisconsin–Madison men's basketball team
Edward Weber, Regional President at Toll Brothers Inc.
Frank Zane, Professional bodybuilder and three-time Mr. Olympia.

References

External links
 Official website
 Wilkes University Athletics

 
Buildings and structures in Wilkes-Barre, Pennsylvania
Educational institutions established in 1933
Universities and colleges in Luzerne County, Pennsylvania
1933 establishments in Pennsylvania
Private universities and colleges in Pennsylvania